"Moho House" is the twenty-first and penultimate episode of the twenty-eighth season of the American animated television series The Simpsons, and the 617th episode of the series overall. It aired in the United States on Fox on May 7, 2017 and the United Kingdom on Sky 1 on May 21, 2017. The episode's name is in reference to British members club Soho House.

Plot

The Simpson family is waiting for Homer to come home for Sunday dinner, but he arrives after hitting Ned Flanders' mailbox and sending it crashing it through the window, leaving Marge to reflect silently her frustration with her husband's behavior. At the power plant, while Homer, Lenny and Carl discuss how Marge did not react badly to what happened, Mr. Burns introduces to them Nigel and his wife. Marge tells Homer their marriage is running out of fuel when she shows up with a picnic lunch, where Homer amazes her by actually eating a carrot. Nigel decides to offer Burns a wager of five million pounds that he can destroy their marriage, and Burns gleefully accepts.

After work, Nigel pressures Homer into breaking his plans to go home to Marge by stating that Homer needs to go to Moe's with him or else Burns will be mad. A lingerie-clad Marge does not understand Homer's "Drinking with a British Guy" emojis, and she is angry after looking out the window for Homer and only seeing Disco Stu with a woman dancing, Wiggum giving Sarah jewels from the evidence box, and Ned giving harps to the ghosts of Maude and Edna. At Moe's Tavern, Nigel keeps pushing Homer to ruin his marriage, but Homer's love is too strong and he goes back home to her, after punching Moe when he finds out that Marge is the "Midge" Moe always refers to. Nigel then explains that he has a way for Moe to break up the Simpsons and make money in the process.

Back at home, Marge refuses to listen to Homer and goes to bed, crying all night. In the morning, Marge is still angry and tells Homer to go to a ballgame with Ned because she does not want to talk to him. Homer is on his way back from the game but notices Moe's Tavern is closed. Moe arrives in a fancy car and tells them he got set up by Nigel at a new 104th-floor super-exclusive bar called MoHo House. At the grand opening of MoHo House, Homer and Marge split up at the center, and Nigel raises up the bet, betting his entire fortune against the rights to an aghast Smithers and Burns accepts. Moe manages to charm Marge and dances with her, while Smithers gives Homer a gift he had been planning to give to his mom for her 81st birthday in order to keep Nigel from winning the bet. Moe runs away when it seems like Marge might be interested in him, but a bartenders' advice to Marge about how Homer treats her the same way over time because he likes the way their relationship is backfires when Marge sees Homer's offering of Smithers' gift which is clearly not for her (he forgot to change the card Smithers had written), and ignores his pleas to forgive him.

At MoHo House, Moe listens to a blues pianist who says via song that his effort to end the Simpsons' marriage is wrong. Moe later texts Marge to meet him at the place, and then Homer, who shows up angry but then listens to Moe's message: Moe apologizes to an angry Marge for always calling her Midge and vows never to steal her from Homer, but warns her that someone else will if Homer does not start treating her well consistently. Homer offers a cute cartoon of him and Marge, and she is won over again. The two make peace, and Burns wins the bet but Smithers, furious at being wagered again by Burns, lies that Nigel is a figment of his imagination and that the check was a fro-yo coupon, leading Burns to tear up the check. To thank him, Nigel gives Smithers a kiss on the lips. As the story ends, Moe returns to his old dive tavern and an elated Barney, while Burns agrees to a new fairer employee contract with Smithers.

Reception
Dennis Perkins of The A.V. Club gave the episode a B+, stating "Luckily, 'Moho House,' the name of the upscale high-rise bar an eccentric billionaire chum of Burns’ buys for Moe as part of a bet to break up Marge and Homer—well, you can see that plot kicking in right there. But seriously, credited writer Jeff Martin knows this world like the back of his five-fingered hand, having penned some genuine classics in his day. True, his one foray back into the showafter a few decades’ absence didn’t quite reach those heights, but it came close, rooting a Marge-Lisa story in some pretty deep character stuff. Here, it’s the same story (if a different plot), with the storied Homer-Marge dynamic actually feeling like it has some stakes."

Tony Sokol of Den of Geek gave the episode 4/5 stars, stating "Tonight is a tour de force for Moe, though. Between the vaguely British knockoff he touts his upcoming conquest to Sideshow Mel to the way he breaks into a grittily hysterical realism on the line 'yeah, well Midge, I don’t know what my deal is with that,' he uses all his voices tonight...Also, that line, and the delivery, humanizes Moe more than his standing down and telling Homer what’s what. He’s got a problem, just with remembering her name."

"Moho House" scored a 1.0 rating with a 4 share and was watched by 2.34 million people, making it Fox's highest rated show of the night.

References

External links
 

2017 American television episodes
The Simpsons (season 28) episodes